Jay Underwood (born October 1, 1968) is an American actor and pastor. Beginning a prolific career as a teen actor in the mid-1980s, he is perhaps best known for his starring feature film roles; portraying Eric Gibb in The Boy Who Could Fly, Chip Carson in Not Quite Human, Grover Dunn in The Invisible Kid, Sonny Bono in The Sonny and Cher Story, Bug in Uncle Buck, and Ernest Hemingway in Young Indiana Jones. He also portrayed the Human Torch in the 1994 unreleased film Fantastic Four.

Career
In 2001, Underwood was honored by the Young Artist Foundation with its Former Child Star "Lifetime Achievement" Award for his role in The Boy Who Could Fly.  Recently, Underwood appeared in the feature film No Greater Love, released in 2010.

Underwood worked for Calvary Bible Church in Burbank, California as junior high pastor from August 2005 to June 2007 while attending The Master's Seminary, and was the full-time pastor of First Baptist Church of Weaverville, California from 2007 to 2020. As of January 1, 2021, Jay returned to Calvary Bible Church in Burbank and is currently Interim Pastor-Teacher.

Partial filmography

 1986 Desert Bloom as Robin
 1986 The Boy Who Could Fly as Eric
 1987 Not Quite Human (TV movie) as Chip Carson
 1987 Promised Land as Circle K Clerk
 1988 The Invisible Kid as Grover Dunn
 1989 Uncle Buck as 'Bug'
 1989 Not Quite Human II (TV Movie) as Chip Carson
 1989 21 Jump Street (TV Series) as Rob Daniels
 1990 Blind Faith (TV Mini-Series) as Chris Marshall
 1990 The Gumshoe Kid as Jeff Sherman
 1990 The Adventures of Ford Fairlane as Club Guy Bob (uncredited)
 1991 Son of Darkness: To Die for II as Danny
 1992 Still Not Quite Human (TV Movie) as Chip Carson
 1993 The Young Indiana Jones Chronicles (TV Series) as Ernest Hemingway
 1994 The Fantastic Four as Johnny Storm
 1994 Stalked as Daryl Gleeson
 1994 The Raffle as Wilson Lowe
 1995 Sleepstalker as Griffin Davis
 1995 A Reason to Believe as Jim Curran
 1996 Star Command (TV Movie) as Ensign Ken Oort
 1996 The Dark Mist as Priamus
 1997 The Nurse as John Beecher
 1997 Afterglow as Donald Duncan
 1998 Possums as John Clark
 1998 Fatal Affair as Ezra Tyler
 1999 Valerie Flake as Tim Darnell
 1999 The Beat Goes On: The Sonny & Cher Story (TV movie) as Sonny Bono
 1999 Dead Dogs as Derek
 2000 Dancing in September as Michael Daniels
 2000 The Girls' Room as Shepp
 2000 Star Trek: Voyager (Episode: "Good Shepherd") as Mortimer Harren
 2001 Road to Redemption as Alan Fischer
 2001 The X-Files (Episode: Empedocles) as Jeb Dukes
 2001 Legend of the Candy Cane (TV movie) as Chester (voice)
 2004 Win a Date with Tad Hamilton! as Police Officer Tom
 2005 Annie's Point (TV movie) as Police Officer
 2006 Where There's a Will (TV movie) as Jimmy Ray
 2010 No Greater Love as Dave
 2016 Drift (Short) as Dad
 2016 Surge of Power: Revenge of the Sequel as Cross
 2019 Surge of Dawn as Cross

References

External links
 

1968 births
Living people
Baptist ministers from the United States
American male film actors
American male television actors
Male actors from Minneapolis
20th-century American male actors
21st-century American male actors